HMS Harwich was a 70-gun third rate ship of the line of the English Royal Navy, built by Sir Anthony Deane at Harwich and launched in 1674. By 1685 she was carrying only 64 guns.

Harwich was wrecked in 1691.

Notes

References

Lavery, Brian (2003) The Ship of the Line - Volume 1: The development of the battlefleet 1650-1850. Conway Maritime Press. .

Ships of the line of the Royal Navy
1670s ships
Ships built in Harwich